Walk Amongst the Living is the fourth album by British synthpop band Blue October.

Track listing

 The Miracle's Gone
 City Lights
 Let Me See
 All is Said and Done
 Tears of Silvery Rain
 Taking on this Love
 Ascension
 The Girl from Ohio
 What's on Your Mind?
 Spinning on the Fullstop
 Non Compos Mentis
 People are Strange
 Beautiful Skin

Personnel
 Ross Carter: Vocals
 Glen Wisbey: Keyboards, programming
 Chris Taubert: Keyboards, sampling
 Nic Johnston: Guitars
 Bob Malkowski : Additional drums and percussion
 Millie Blue: Backing vocals on "Spinning on the Fullstop"

2008 albums
Blue October (British band) albums